Digimon Fusion, known in Japan as , is the sixth anime television series in the Digimon franchise, produced by Toei Animation. The series was broadcast on TV Asahi and Asahi Broadcasting Corporation between July 2010 and March 2012.

Its storyline follows the adventures of Mikey Kudo, who utilizes the power to fuse any of his Digimon partners.

The series was licensed outside of Asia by Saban Brands for an English-language adaptation, which was produced by Studiopolis; the third and final arc did not receive an English localization. The series was also adapted into a manga series and multiple video games.

Plot

Season 1

Mikey Kudo receives the Fusion Loader, creates his own team (Fusion Fighters) and recruits some Digimon partners in the Digital World. There, he learns that Lord Bagramon is attempting to conquer the world by collecting 108 Code Crown fragments and wields the Darkness Loader. Mikey collects some fragments from each zones, but Bagramon steals them and recruits AxeKnightmon. Mikey, Angie Hinomoto and Jeremy Tsurugi are sent back to the human world, but Mikey returns to the Digital World, leaving his friends behind.

Season 2

When Bagramon creates an empire divided into seven kingdoms, Mikey, Christopher Aonuma and Nene Amano defeat each generals. They learn that Bagramon is using Ewan to oppose them, while they gathered negative energy from those which transformed fragments into a Dark Stone (D5). After Mikey saves Ewan and retrieves all fragments, Shoutmon defeats Bagramon and plans to bring peace to both worlds.

Season 3

One year later, Mikey discovers an unstable realm between both worlds and learns that Quartzmon is absorbing data. The DigiQuartz is where Digimon Hunters capture Digimon for leaving any world and feeding negative emotions on anyone. The Clock Store Owner unites all heroic characters from different parallel universes. Tagiru and Gumdramon wield Bagramon's lost arm "Brave Snatcher", in order to defeat Quartzmon. With both worlds restored, all humans and their partners are separately return to their own universe. The series ends with Mikey, Tagiru and their friends planning their future.

Production
Digimon Xros Wars was first publicly revealed in the June 2010 issue of Shueisha's V Jump magazine, including the name of the series and brief descriptions of the series and several main characters. It was directed by Tetsuya Endo and written by Riku Sanjo.  A number of staffs and voice actors for the anime were selected from those from Gegege no Kitarō (2007) and Hakaba Kitarō (2008) including Riku Sanjo and Minami Takayama. A third season was decided suddenly, with Yukio Kaizawa as the main writer for the first episode. In order to retain the series' popularity, Mikey Kudo remained as a returning character, while Christopher and Nene were removed from the main cast. Instead, Ewan remained as a protagonist due to his character still needing growth. The series was the first to be broadcast in widescreen 16:9 and in HD 1080i and aired on TV Asahi between July 6, 2010, and March 25, 2012. Crunchyroll  began streaming the original Japanese version of the series outside of Japan, with English subtitles, in November 2011. Disney XD in Malaysia aired a William Winckler-produced English version along with original Chinese and Malay dubs based on the original Japanese version from December 8, 2012, titled Digimon Fusion Battles.

The series was licensed by Saban Brands for an English language release to air in North America, contracting Studiopolis to dub the series into English and hiring Noam Kaniel (Noam) (who worked on X-Men, Code Lyoko, and Power Rangers) to compose the music for the series. The series began airing on Nickelodeon on September 7, 2013, was moved to Nicktoons after three episodes, and later began airing on The CW's Vortexx programming block from January 25, 2014 to September 27, 2014. The first season became available for streaming on Netflix starting September 13, 2014, while the second season became available on March 8, 2016. In Latin America, the series began being broadcast on Cartoon Network on May 1, 2014. Beginning on February 24, 2014, Fusion began airing in the United Kingdom on CITV, the same channel that aired the first three seasons. In Canada, YTV, which aired previous installments of the franchise (barring Digimon Data Squad), began airing the series on February 28, 2014, with thirty episodes. In the Philippines, it began airing on Yey! after the end of Digimon Frontier, but it ended on July 1, 2020 (due to ABS-CBN's franchise renewal controversy).

Home media
The series was released on DVD with nineteen volumes by Bandai Visual in Japan from April 22, 2011 to August 24, 2012. A DVD box was released on November 22, 2016.  Part I was released in the US on February 10, 2015, via Cinedigm; Part II was released on March 1, 2016. In Australia, the first season was released by Roadshow Entertainment on June 11, 2014.

Theme songs
Kousuke Yamashita composed the music for the series. A total of three CD soundtracks under the label of Music Code were released in Japan on September 29, 2010, March 23, 2011 and January 18, 2012.

Opening theme songs (Japan)
 by Sonar Pocket (1-30)
"New World" by Twill (31-54)
"STAND UP" by Twill (55-79)

Insert songs (Japan)
 by Kōji Wada
"Blazing Blue Flare" by Hideaki Takatori
"X4B The Guardian!" by Kōji Wada
 by Kōji Wada
 by Takayoshi Tanimoto
"Evolution &Digixros ver.TAIKI" by Kōji Wada and Takayoshi Tanimoto
"Evolution &Digixros ver.KIRIHA" by Kōji Wada and Takayoshi Tanimoto
 by Kōji Wada, Takayoshi Tanimoto and Ayumi Miyazaki
 by Psychic Lover
"Shining Dreamers" by Takafumi Iwasaki
 by YOFFY and Takafumi Iwasaki

Theme song (US / International - Outside Asia)

"Act as One (Digimon Fusion Theme)" by Noam Kaniel (Noam) and Frederic Jaffre (1-54)

Related media
A manga adaptation, illustrated by Yuki Nakashima, was serialized in Shueisha's V Jump magazine from June 21, 2010, to March 21, 2012. Its twenty-one chapters were collected in four tankōbon volumes, released from December 29, 2010, to May 2, 2012.

A video game based on the series, was released in Red and Blue versions for the Nintendo DS on March 3, 2011. Together, Super Xros Wars serves as the fourth game in the Digimon Story series. Bandai released a series of card games in North America.

Reception
On its Japanese premiere, Digimon Fusion had a rating of 4.1 viewers. Digimon Xros Wars: The Boy Hunters Who Leapt Through Time was nominated for the 2012 International Emmy Kids Awards for "Best Animation". Famicom Tsūshin scored Digimon Story: Super Xros Wars 32 out of 40. Early responses by Anime News Network praised the pilot, stating nostalgic Digimon fans would enjoy it based on its new approach to power-ups within the main cast and compared it to the highly acclaimed mecha series Gurren Lagann despite suffering from cliches often seen in other anime. Voice actor Kyle Hebert said he enjoyed working in the English dub of the series as his two characters, Dorulumon and Balistamon, offered diverse characterization. Fellow actor Ben Diskin shared similar feelings, commenting he had been a fan of Fusion ever since its Japanese premiere and thus was glad to be voicing both Shoutmon and Cutemon, another pair of characters whose personalities differ greatly.

General critical reception has also been positive. Mediaverum enjoyed the early episodes from Fusion and recommended it to fans of both the first two Digimon Adventure series. While noting the series was aimed at a young audience, DVDCorner wrote that the series still had deep themes which might attract older viewers despite its flaws. ICv2 recommended the series for a young audience when checking the English DVDs. CulturedVultures left it up to the viewers to watch it or not, also recommending it to an audience that has knowledge of the franchise, while Metro stated it retained the appeal of its predecessors which overshadowed the famous Pokémon back in the 1990s. DVDTalk found mixed feelings when reviewing Fusion. While he lamented the series' focus on Digimons rather than humans, he still praised the show for its animation and recommended it to fans of the series. Capsule Monster commented that despite the apparent attempts of the series to expand marketing, Fusion offers an appealing story, as rather than focusing on friendship, it also contains dark themes rarely seen in children's shows which might attract other audiences.

References

External links

Official Japanese websites
TV Asahi's official Digimon Xros Wars website
The Evil Death Generals and the Seven Kingdoms
The Boy Hunters Who Leapt Through Time
Toei Animation's official Digimon Xros Wars website
The Boy Hunters Who Leapt Through Time
Digimon website
Data Carddass: Super Digica Taisen
Digimon Story: Super Xros Wars, Blue and Red

Official English websites
Digimon Fusion Nicktoons website
Digimon Fusion at SabanBrands.com

Others

2006 video games
Adventure anime and manga
Anime and manga about parallel universes
Crossover anime and manga
Digimon anime and manga
Fantasy anime and manga
Animated television series about children
Television series about parallel universes
Shōnen manga
Toei Animation television
TV Asahi original programming
Video games with alternative versions